Gladwell is an English surname. Notable people with the surname include: 

David Gladwell (born 1935), British film editor and director
Malcolm Gladwell (born 1963), Canadian writer
Nathan Gladwell (fl. 2000s), British actor
Robbie Gladwell, British rock and blues guitarist
Rodney Gladwell (1928–1979), British artist 
Shaun Gladwell (born 1972), Australian contemporary artist